Sir William Theodore Doxford  (1 February 1841 – 1 October 1916) was a British shipbuilder and politician.

Early life
Doxford was born at Bridge Street (leading to Wearmouth Bridge) in Bishopwearmouth, County Durham, on 1 February 1841. He was the eldest son of the eight surviving children of William Doxford (1812–1882) and his wife, Hannah Pile Doxford (1814–1895). He was baptised on 14 March 1841 in St Michaels, Bishopwearmouth (now the Sunderland Minster). 

After graduating from Bramham College in the West Riding of Yorkshire in 1857, Doxford began to work at his father's company, William Doxford & Sons, upon its creation in 1858 at its new headquarters at Pallion on the River Wear.

Family
On 9 April 1863, Doxford married Margaret Wilkinson (1842–1916), daughter of Richard Wilkinson, a local shipbuilder. They eventually had nine children, six of whom survived to adulthood:

Margaret Eveline (1864–1960), married John Hunt Hedley (1858–1914), a valuer.
William Theodore (1866–1870)
(Albert) Ernest (1867–1937), a marine engine builder; married Bertha Eleanor Warner (1866–1949).
Harold (1869–1869)
Mary Hannah (1870–1948), married Alfred Octavius Hedley (1861–1926; brother of the above John Hunt Hedley), a solicitor.
Theodore (1874–1876)
Norah (1876–1965), married (Andrew Leyland) Hillyar Cleland (1868–1943), son of John Cleland of Stormont Castle.
(Annie) Greta (1878–1968), died unmarried.
(Wilhelmine) Vera (1883–1955), married Stanley Miller Thompson (1883–1948), creator of The Silver Line.

Politics
After several years of success in his shipbuilding company (held jointly by him and his brothers since their father's death in 1882), Doxford became the first Conservative in forty years to be elected for the two-seat constituency of Sunderland, when he became a Unionist Member of Parliament in 1895. Knighted for his services by Queen Victoria at Osborne House on 9 February 1900, he retired from parliament in 1906. He was also present at Gladstone's funeral service at Westminster Abbey in 1898.

Doxford had also been involved in local affairs, serving on Sunderland town council, as a River Wear commissioner and as a magistrate for Sunderland and County Durham. He was also a Deputy Lieutenant for County Durham from 1896 and was a founding member and second president of the North-East Coast Institution of Engineers and Shipbuilders. 

Joining the Institution of Naval Architects in 1878, he was elected a council member in 1896 and became vice-president in 1908. He also represented Wearside on the National Federation of Shipbuilding Employers and was chairman of the Wear Shipbuilders' Association from 1908 to 1912.

Death

Doxford died on 1 October 1916, aged 74, at his home, Grindon Hall, a few months after the death of his wife. He was buried with his wife in Bishopwearmouth Cemetery.

References

Alan G. Jamieson, Doxford, Sir William Theodore (1841–1916), Oxford Dictionary of National Biography, Oxford University Press, 2004 accessed 15 May 2008

Further reading
William Doxford and Company (1921)
J. W. Smith and T. S. Holden, Where ships are born: Sunderland, 1346–1946, revised edition (1953)
D. Dougan, The history of north east shipbuilding (1968)
J. F. Clarke, A century of service to engineering and shipbuilding: a centenary history of the North East Coast Institution of Engineers and Shipbuilders, 1884–1984 (1984)
J. F. Clarke, Doxford, Sir William Theodore, Dictionary of business biography
Transactions of the Institution of Naval Architects, 49 (1917), 233

External links 
 

1841 births
1916 deaths
Conservative Party (UK) MPs for English constituencies
Deputy Lieutenants of Durham
English shipbuilders
Knights Bachelor
People from Sunderland
Businesspeople from Tyne and Wear
Politicians from Tyne and Wear
UK MPs 1895–1900
UK MPs 1900–1906
19th-century English businesspeople